The House Between the Worlds is a novel by Marion Zimmer Bradley published in 1981.

Plot summary
The House Between the Worlds is a novel in which graduate student Fenton experiments with drugs to trigger paranormal events.

Reception
Greg Costikyan reviewed The House Between the Worlds in Ares Magazine #11 and commented that "The House Between Worlds is a pleasant fantasy with more action than is usual in a Bradley novel. Since Bradley stopped writing Darkover stories, her writing has suffered; she hasn't been able to develop a theme as interesting as Darkover. In House, she's discovered her voice again. It is recommended."

Reviews
Review by Baird Searles (1980) in Isaac Asimov's Science Fiction Magazine, September 1980 
Review by Roz Kaveney (1980) in Foundation, #20 October 1980

References

1981 novels